Karl Heinrich Menges (April 22, 1908 – September 20, 1999) was a German linguist known for his advocacy of the Altaic hypothesis. He was a faculty member at Columbia University in New York and subsequently at the University of Vienna.

Menges was born in Frankfurt, where he was educated at the Lessing Gymnasium. He studied in Frankfurt and Munich and earned his doctorate at the University of Berlin in 1932. Politically identifying as a Catholic centrist, he resisted the Nazi regime, distributing leaflets. In 1936 he was arrested by the Gestapo and interrogated for five hours; on a tip-off from a classmate, after being released pending trial he fled to Czechoslovakia, after the annexation of the Sudetenland moving on to Turkey.

Menges taught at Columbia University in New York for 36 years, from 1940 to 1976. He had been invited to teach Slavic languages; the university discovered only after his arrival that he was a scholar of the then little-studied Altaic languages. After his retirement from Columbia he taught at the University of Vienna until shortly before his death in Vienna at the age of 91. Over his career, he taught at a total of 13 institutions in seven countries.

At the age of 19, Menges was one of the first Westerners to visit the Volga region and the Caucasus within the Soviet Union. He was quoted variously as saying he spoke between 24 and "over 50" languages, and said that when he came to the United States he was the only person in the country who could speak Uzbek. He won a Guggenheim Fellowship in 1972. He published numerous articles and 15 books; a revised edition of his The Turkic Languages and Peoples, first published in 1968, appeared in 1995. His articles, as well as his teaching, were characteristically interdisciplinary, and in addition to Altaic, he made important contributions to Slavic, Turkic, Tungusic, and Dravidian language studies. A complete thematically organized index of his publications appeared in 2006.

References

Further reading
 Roy Andrew Miller. "In memoriam Karl Heinrich Menges". Ural-Altaische Jahrbücher NF 16 (1999/2000) 1–10.

1908 births
1999 deaths
Writers from Frankfurt
Humboldt University of Berlin alumni
Columbia University faculty
Academic staff of the University of Vienna
Linguists from Germany
Paleolinguists
Linguists of Altaic languages
German emigrants to the United States
20th-century linguists